Demonic Art is the fifth album by metal band Darkane. It is the only album to feature vocalist Jens Broman. The concept of the album is based on the song "Organic Canvas" from Layers of Lies.

Track listing
 "Variations of an Eye Crush" (instrumental) - 1:31
 "Leaving Existence" - 3:59
 "Demonic Art" - 4:45
 "Absolution" - 4:00
 "Execution 44" - 4:56
 "Impetuous Constant Chaos" - 3:48
 "Demigod" - 4:15
 "Sole Survivor" - 4:08
 "The Killing of I" - 4:49
 "Wrong Grave" (instrumental) - 0:53
 "Still in Progress" - 3:22
 "Wrath Connection" - 5:35
 "Reborn in Greed" (American bonus track) - 3:58
 "Innocence Gone" (live) (Japanese bonus track)

Credits
'''Darkane
Christofer Malmström - lead guitar
Peter Wildoer - drums
Jörgen Löfberg - bass
Klas Ideberg - rhythm guitar
Jens Broman - vocals

References

Darkane albums
2008 albums
Nuclear Blast albums